Columbella strombiformis, common name stromboid dove shell, is a species of sea snail, a marine gastropod mollusk in the family Columbellidae, the dove snails.

Description

Distribution
This species is present in Northern Sea of Cortèz and from Western Mexico to Peru.

References

Columbellidae
Gastropods described in 1822